Furius Antias was an ancient Roman poet, born in Antium.

Following William Smith, Dictionary of Greek and Roman Biography and Mythology, (1870), art. Bibaculus, his full name was Aulus Furius Antias and he was the poet Furius whose friendship with Quintus Lutatius Catulus, consul in 102 BC, is attested by Cicero (Brutus, ch. 35).
Smith, Dictionary

Gellius, Noctes Atticae, 18, 11, defends his neologisms against the critic Caesellius Vindex.

Macrobius, Saturnalia, 6, 1, quotes several lines of Furius's Annales which would be copied by Virgil.

Editions
Willy Morel, Fragmenta poetarum latinorum epicorum et lyricorum praeter Ennium et Lucilium, Leipzig, Teubner, 1927. (New ed. Leipzig 1995.)

Furius Antias (Aulus Furius Antias) [fragmenta in aliis scriptis seruata]; Bibliotheca Teubneriana Latina.

Studies
W. W. Batstone, "The Fragments of Furius Antias", Classical Quarterly, New Series, 46 (1996), pp. 387–402.

References

Old Latin-language writers
Furii
2nd-century BC Romans
1st-century BC Romans
2nd-century BC poets
1st-century BC Roman poets